Great Lives is a BBC Radio 4 biography series, produced in Bristol. It has been presented by Joan Bakewell, Humphrey Carpenter, Francine Stock and currently (since April 2006) Matthew Parris. A distinguished guest is asked to nominate the person they feel is truly deserving of the title "Great Life". The presenter and a recognised expert (a biographer, family member or fellow practitioner) are on hand to discuss the life.  The programmes are 28 minutes long, originally broadcast on Fridays at 23:00, more recently at 16:30 on Tuesday with a repeat at 23:00 on Friday.

Programmes

Series 0, August – November 2001

Series 1, May – August 2002

Series 2, October – December 2002

Series 3, April – June 2003

Series 4, October – December 2003

Series 5, April – June 2004

Series 6, October – December 2004

1The programme originally was scheduled by the guest film-maker David Puttnam who nominated the Michael Collins, Irish nationalist leader) was withdrawn due to "production quality".

Hogmanay Special, 31 December 2004

Carpenter died on 4 January 2005, this was his last Great Lives programme 1

Series 7, April – June 2005

Series 8, October 2005 – February 2006

Series 9, April – June 2006

Series 10, August – September 2006

Series 11, December 2006 – January 2007

Series 12, April – May 2007

Series 13, August – October 2007

Series 14, December 2007 – January 2008

Series 15, April – May 2008

Series 16, August – September 2008

Series 17, December 2008 – February 2009

Series 18, April – May 2009

Series 19, August – September 2009

Series 20, December 2009 – February 2010

Series 21, April – May 2010

Series 22, August – September 2010

Series 23, November 2010 – January 2011

Garvey was previously nominated by Yvonne Brown in Series 7 Programme 7 1

Series 24, April – May 2011

Series 25, August – September 2011

Series 26, December 2011 – January 2012

Series 27, April – May 2012

Series 28, July – September 2012

Series 29, December 2012 – January 2013

Series 30, April – May 2013

Series 31, August – October 2013

Series 32, December 2013 – January 2014

Series 33, April – May 2014

Series 34, August – October 2014

Series 35, December 2014 – January 2015

Series 36, April – May 2015

Series 37, August – September 2015

Series 38, December 2015 – January 2016

Series 39, April – May 2016

Series 40, August – September 2016

Series 41, December 2016 – January 2017

Series 42, April – May 2017

Series 43, August – September 2017

Series 44, December 2017 - January 2018

Series 45, April – May 2018

Series 46, July – September 2018

Series 47, December 2018 – January 2019

Series 48, April – May 2019

Series 49, July – September 2019

Series 50, December 2019 – January 2020

Series 51, April – June 2020

Series 52, August – September 2020

Series 53, December 2020 – January 2021

Series 54, April – June 2021

Series 55, August – September 2021

Series 56, December 2021 – January 2022

Series 57, April – May 2022

References

External links

 
 Detailed list of Great Lives episodes

BBC Radio 4 programmes